Daniel C. Goldie (born October 3, 1963) is a former tennis player from the United States who won 2 singles (1987, Newport and 1988, Seoul) and 2 doubles titles (1986, Wellington and 1987, Newport). The right-hander reached the quarterfinals of Wimbledon in 1989 where he beat Kelly Evernden, Jimmy Connors, Wally Masur and Slobodan Živojinović before losing to Ivan Lendl. He achieved a career-high ATP singles ranking of World No. 27 in April 1989. Before turning pro, Goldie played tennis for Stanford University, where he won the 1986 National Singles Championship before graduating with a degree in Economics.

In 2011, Goldie co-authored The Investment Answer, a #1 New York Times bestselling book for individual investors. Goldie is currently President of Dan Goldie Financial Services LLC, an independent financial advisor located in Palo Alto, California. He has been recognized by Barron's as one of the top 100 independent financial advisors in the U.S. He currently resides in Palo Alto, California.

Career finals

Singles (2 titles)

Doubles (2 titles, 2 runner-ups)

References

External links
 
 
 Dan Goldie Financial Services LLC
 The Investment Answer

1963 births
Living people
American male tennis players
People from Palo Alto, California
Sportspeople from Sioux City, Iowa
Stanford Cardinal men's tennis players
Tennis people from California
Tennis people from Iowa
Universiade medalists in tennis
Universiade silver medalists for the United States
Medalists at the 1983 Summer Universiade